The World Team Chess Championship is an international team chess event, eligible for the participation of 10 countries whose chess federations dominate their continent. It is played every two years. In chess, this tournament and the Chess Olympiads are the most important international tournaments for teams. 
  
The strongest national teams in the world participate, and also some teams represent an entire continent. A full round is played by the teams, meaning that each team plays against every other team. At the first tournament, in 1985, teams consisted of six players; since then, teams have been reduced to four players. Reserve players are permitted.

From 1985, the championship was held every four years; since 2011, it has been held every two years. Since 2007, there has been a separate championship for women teams, which is also held every two years.
Since 2007, the final scores depend on the team results; before 2007, the individual scores determined the final ranking.

Summary of results

All data from OlimpBase World Team Chess Championship.

Open section team medals

Women's team medals

Total team ranking

Open section total ranking 
The table contains the men's teams ranked by the medals won at the World Team Championships.

Women's section total ranking 
The table contains the women's teams ranked by the medals won at the World Team Championships.

See also

Chess Olympiad
European Team Chess Championship
Russia (USSR) vs Rest of the World
Women's Chess Olympiad
European Chess Club Cup
World Chess Championship
World Mind Sports Games
Mind Sports Organisation
Correspondence Chess Olympiad

References

OlimpBase World Team Chess Championship

Team